4340 Dence, provisional designation , is a background or Phocaea asteroid from the inner regions of the asteroid belt, approximately  in diameter. It was discovered on 4 May 1986, by American astronomer Carolyn Shoemaker at the Palomar Observatory in California. The S-type asteroid has a rotation period of 7.5 hours. It was named after Canadian geologist Michael R. Dence.

Orbit and classification 

Dence is a non-family asteroid of the main belt's background population when applying the hierarchical clustering method to its proper orbital elements. Based on osculating Keplerian orbital elements, the asteroid has also been classified as a member of the stony Phocaea family. It orbits the Sun in the inner asteroid belt at a distance of 1.8–2.9 AU once every 3 years and 8 months (1,353 days; semi-major axis of 2.39 AU). Its orbit has an eccentricity of 0.23 and an inclination of 25° with respect to the ecliptic. The body's observation arc begins with a precovery taken at the Siding Spring Observatory in November 1979, more than six years prior to its official discovery observation at Palomar.

Physical characteristics 

In the SMASS classification, Dence is a common, stony S-type asteroid.

Rotation period 
Since 2008, several rotational lightcurves of Dence have been obtained from photometric observations by Czech astronomer Petr Pravec and by Maurice Clark at the observatory of the Montgomery College in Maryland, United States. Analysis of the best-rated lightcurve gave a rotation period of 7.546 hours with a brightness amplitude of 0.58 magnitude.

Diameter and albedo 

According to the survey carried out by the NEOWISE mission of NASA's Wide-field Infrared Survey Explorer, Dence measures 8.110 kilometers in diameter and its surface has an albedo of 0.155, while the Collaborative Asteroid Lightcurve Link assumes an albedo of 0.23 – derived from 25 Phocaea, the parent body of the Phocaea family – and calculates a diameter of 8.37 kilometers based on an absolute magnitude of 12.6.

Naming 

This minor planet was named after Canadian geologist Michael R. Dence executive director of the Royal Society of Canada. He was a pioneer in the geologic investigation of ancient impact craters on the Canadian Shield (also see Sudbury Basin and Manicouagan Reservoir). The official naming citation was published by the Minor Planet Center on 30 January 1991.

Notes

References

External links 
 Asteroid Lightcurve Database (LCDB), query form (info )
 Dictionary of Minor Planet Names, Google books
 Discovery Circumstances: Numbered Minor Planets (1)-(5000) – Minor Planet Center
 
 

004340
Discoveries by Carolyn S. Shoemaker
Named minor planets
004340
19860504